Neustadt am Rübenberge is a town in the district of Hannover, in Lower Saxony, Germany. At , it is the 9th largest settlement in Germany by area (following Berlin, Hamburg and Cologne), though only about 45,000 inhabitants live there. It is in a region known as the Hanoverian Moor Geest.

Boroughs

 
 
 
 
 
 
 
 
 Dudensen
 Eilvese
 
 Esperke
 
 Hagen
 
 
 
 
 Mandelsloh
 
 Mariensee

Mayor
Dominic Herbst (Alliance 90/The Greens) has served as mayor since 2019. He succeeded Uwe Sternbeck (Alliance 90/The Greens), who had been the mayor from 2004.

Twin towns – sister cities

Neustadt am Rübenberge is twinned with:
 La Ferté-Macé, France (1980)

Notable people
Friedrich Dedekind, humanist, theologian and writer
Euricius Dedekind (1554–1619), composer
Georg Caspar Schürmann (1672–1751), composer, singer
Ludwig Christoph Heinrich Hölty (1748–1776), poet in the Göttinger Hainbund. 
Gerhard von Scharnhorst (1755–1813), Prussian General and army reformer.
Georg Grabenhorst (1899–1997), writer
Robert Enke (1977–2009), footballer, died here
Deniz Aycicek (born 1990), footballer
Sebastian Ernst (footballer) (born 1995), footballer

See also
Eilvese transmitter (demolished in 1931)

References

External links

 
Hanover Region